Bethany Independent-Presbyterian Church (IPC) is an independent church located between the Paya Lebar and Serangoon areas of central Singapore.  It is the mother church of the IPC Family, which spans Singapore, India, Australia and Myanmar.

The church's teachings and practices are based on a belief in the inerrancy of the Bible and its final authority in faith and life. 

The church maintains a Bible study resource on its website as well as audio and video recordings of weekly messages.

History
Bethany IPC grew out of a Sunday School outreach to the Seletar Hills estate by Bible Presbyterian Church of Singapore.  It was founded as a house church in 1973 with 25 members and moved to its current location at 301 Upper Paya Lebar Road, Singapore 534934 in 1993.

Sunday Worship Services
 Morning Worship	10.30am
 Teens’ Worship	10.30am
 Children's Worship	10.30am
 Evening Worship	4pm
 Bilingual Worship	4pm

Ministries

Sunday School
The Sunday School Ministry caters to children and adults.  It aims to instruct every Christian in the Word of God and equip each one for effective service.

Weekday Meetings
Bible Studies
Prayer Meetings

Fellowship groups
Young People's Group
Young Adults’ Group
Adults’ Ministry and Discipleship groups

Camps & seminars
Family Camp (March school holidays)
Young Adults’ Group Seminar (2-3 times/ year)
Youth Conference (December school holidays)
Junior Camp (June school holidays)

Music ministry
Choirs (One Voice, Youth, Evergreens, Crossroads, Remnant)
Handbells & Chimes

References

External links

Churches in Singapore
Christian organizations established in 1973